Computer Chronicles is an American half-hour television series, which was broadcast from 1983 to 2002 on Public Broadcasting Service (PBS) public television. Presented by Gary Kildall, Stewart Cheifet, and George Morrow, the series documented various issues from the rise of the personal computer from its infancy to the global market at the turn of the 21st century.

Computer Chronicles was created in 1983 by Stewart Cheifet (later the show's co-host), who was then the station manager of the College of San Mateo's KCSM-TV. The series was initially broadcast as a local weekly series, co-produced by WITF-TV in Harrisburg, Pennsylvania. It became a national series on PBS from 1983 to 2002, with Cheifet co-hosting most of the later seasons. Kildall served as co-host from 1983 to 1990, providing insights and commentary on products, as well as discussions on the future of the ever-expanding personal computer sphere.

A total of 488 episodes of Computer Chronicles were produced from 1983 to 2002. New episodes broadcast on Sundays with a duration of 30 minutes, four episodes a month, 48 episodes per year. All episodes were digitized and provided to the Internet Archive for free streaming and download.

Episodes

Overview

Season 1 (1984)

Season 2 (1985)

Season 3 (1985-86)

Season 4 (1986–87)

Season 5 (1987–88)

Season 6 (1988–89)

Season 7 (1989–90)

Season 8 (1990–91)

Season 9 (1991–92)

Season 10 (1992–93)

Season 11 (1993–94)

Season 12 (1994–95)

Season 13 (1995–96)

Season 14 (1995–97)

Season 15 (1997–98)

Season 16 (1998–99)

Season 17 (1999–2000)

Season 18 (2000–01)

Season 19 (2001–02)

References

External links
 

Lists of American non-fiction television series episodes